Myanmar Imperial University, formerly Myanmar Imperial College, is a private university in Yangon, Myanmar, located in Dagon Township's Phayagyi ward. Established in 2010 as the Myanmar Imperial College, the university is accredited with Pearson Education in partnership with the University of Northampton in the United Kingdom. The school has approximately 1,400 registered students and an alumni network of 3,200 graduates.

Student life 
In 2019, the university's futsal club won third place at the AFF Futsal Cup in Korat, Thailand.

Controversy 
In June 2019, Kyaw Zin Win, a librarian, committed suicide, due to workplace bullying, after his superiors allegedly forced him to come out at work and mocked him. Three university employees were suspended after his death. The Myanmar National Human Rights Commission investigated the case, but did not make its findings public. Activists criticized the university for not taking accountability in the case. His death brought attention to the prevalence of workplace harassment in Myanmar, which is experienced by 40% of workers.

References

External links 

 

Education in Yangon
Educational institutions established in 2010
2010 establishments in Myanmar